The Bend Skyliners Lodge, located in Bend, Oregon, is listed on the National Register of Historic Places.

See also
 National Register of Historic Places listings in Deschutes County, Oregon

References

1936 establishments in Oregon
Buildings and structures completed in 1936
Hotels in Bend, Oregon
National Park Service rustic in Oregon
National Register of Historic Places in Bend, Oregon